Plan Giralda was a British plan for military intervention in Zanzibar following the 1964 revolution.   Giralda was intended to be launched if the  radical left-wing Umma Party attempted to launch a coup against the government of President Julius Nyerere's newly formed Tanzania.  It was the fifth and final British plan for such an eventuality, following Operations Parthenon, Boris, Finery and Shed.  Giralda would have required British Army units, Royal Marines and Royal Navy vessels from the Far East to be deployed to Zanzibar if a request was received from Nyerere.  Follow on units would be sent after the main assault from the British garrison in Kenya.  The operational constraints of sending troops over such long distances, the reluctance of the Kenyan government to weaken the British presence in their country, the reduction of Western presence in Zanzibar and the strengthening of the political situation in Tanzania made intervention unlikely and the plan was suspended in October 1964.  The newly elected Labour government cancelled the plan in December.

Objectives 
The Zanzibar Revolution had occurred on 12 January and since then British forces had kept a presence in the area to safeguard European citizens.  Since 30 January British forces had also been kept on standby to launch a military intervention in the event that the radical left-wing Umma Party staged a coup to overthrow President Abeid Karume's moderate Afro-Shirazi Party which controlled the governing Revolutionary Council.  Plan Giralda was the fifth British plan for this eventuality, following Operations Parthenon, Boris, Finery and Shed.  The other four operations had been cancelled by the time that Giralda was put into place.  Giralda was designed as a replacement for Operation Shed and was introduced around 23 September 1964.  Since the revolution Zanzibar had merged with the African mainland country of Tanganyika to form Tanzania and Giralda was designed as a means of intervention in case the Zanzibar-based Umma Party attempted a coup against President Julius Nyerere of Tanzania.

Operation 

Plan Giralda was to have used British troops from Aden and the Far East to launch a military intervention in Zanzibar.  Troops from British garrisons in Kenya had been designated for previous intervention plans but they were cancelled due to security and secrecy concerns.  Giralda called for an infantry battalion and a tactical headquarters unit to be shipped from Aden to the British naval and air base on Gan in the Maldives where they would rendezvous with a Royal Marines commando unit and vessels of the Royal Navy drawn from the Far East.  Because of the long distances involved it was estimated that it would take 11 to 15 days for the entire force to reach Zanzibar following the initial order. Once the force had reached the island it was capable of remaining embarked and out of sight of land for up to 15 days before operational efficiency would be compromised.  One of the problems facing the plan was that President Nyerere's agreement had to be given for the operation to go ahead and the 11- to 15-day delay between this agreement and the arrival of troops may have weakened his resolve for action.  If, however, the troops were sent in anticipation of this agreement they could only remain on board the ships for a finite time before they would have to be publicly disembarked.  Resource constraints meant that an amphibious assault force with attendant ships could not be kept permanently ready in the theatre as this capability had been ruled out in the 1961 strategy paper "British strategy in the 1960s".

Giralda would have relied on follow on forces drawn from bases in Kenya or transported through Kenya from Aden to maintain security after the initial assault.  The movement of these troops was subject to the agreement of the Kenyan government and so put the safety of British troops at the discretion of a foreign government.  Similar political problems had affected the reinforcement of Kuwait in 1961.  The support of the Kenyan government might have been difficult to obtain as the reinforcements may have come from the British garrison there which had recently been required to quell mutinies in the Kenyan army.  By the autumn Western interests in Zanzibar were practically non-existent and in October the British Chiefs of Staff were informed that Nyerere was very unlikely to request intervention and as a result the plan was suspended.  The October 1964 British general election 
brought in a Labour government which scrapped Giralda in December.  The government decided not to inform Nyerere that it no longer considered itself bound to respond to any request for intervention.  Giralda was the last plan for British military intervention in Zanzibar.

References

Bibliography 
.
.

History of Zanzibar
Giralda
1964 in military history
1964 in Zanzibar